Bascomville is an unincorporated community in Chester County, in the U.S. state of South Carolina.

History
According to tradition, the community was named after Bishop Bascom, a M. E. Church leader.

In 1925, Bascomville had 34 inhabitants.

References

Unincorporated communities in South Carolina
Unincorporated communities in Chester County, South Carolina